The 2004 Indian general election in Uttarakhand, occurred for 5 seats in the state. 3 seats were won by the Bharatiya Janata Party, 1 seat by Indian National Congress and 1 seat by Samajwadi Party.

Elected MPs
Following is the list of elected MPs from Uttarakhand.

By-election
By-elections were held in 2007 for Tehri Garhwal constituency on the death of Elected MP Manabendra Shah and for Garhwal constituency as Elected MP B. C. Khanduri became the Chief Minister of Uttarakhand.

In the election for Tehri Garhwal constituency, Indian National Congress candidate Vijay Bahuguna defeated Manujendra Shah, son of Manabendra Shah by margin of over 22,000.

In the election for Garhwal constituency, Bharatiya Janata Party candidate Tejpal Singh Rawat defeated Satpal Maharaj.

See also 

 Elections in Uttarakhand
 Politics of Uttarakhand
 2004 Indian general election
 14th Lok Sabha
 List of members of the 14th Lok Sabha

References

Uttarakhand
Indian general elections in Uttarakhand